Park Ji-Ho (born 4 July 1970) is a retired South Korean football player.

Club career
He used to play for Daegu University, LG Cheetahs, Pohang Steelers, Guangzhou Apollo (China) and Ilhwa Chunma. On 9 March 1997, he scored the golden goal for Pohang against Ilhwa Chunma in the 1996–97 Asian Club Championship final.

Honours

Club

LG Cheetahs
K-League Runner-up(1):1993
K-League Cup Runner-up(1):1994

Pohang Steelers
K-League Runners-up(1):1995
FA Cup Champions(1):1996
K-League Cup Runners-up(1):1997
AFC Champions League Champions(1):1997
Asian Super Cup Runners-up(1):1997

Cheonan Ilhwa Chunma
FA Cup Champions(1): 1999

References

External links 

Living people
1970 births
Hannam University alumni
South Korean footballers
South Korean expatriate footballers
South Korea international footballers
Pohang Steelers players
Guangzhou F.C. players
FC Seoul players
Seongnam FC players
K League 1 players
South Korean expatriate sportspeople in China
Expatriate footballers in China
Association football defenders